Summer Street (est. 1708) in Boston, Massachusetts, extends from Downtown Crossing in the Financial District, over Fort Point Channel, and into the Seaport District to the southeast. In the mid-19th century it was also called Seven Star Lane.

Along the route is Dewey Square, which is formed by the intersection of Atlantic Avenue, Summer, Federal, and Purchase Streets with the Surface Artery of the Boston Central Artery (I-93). The intermodal transit terminal South Station is also located along the road, with Amtrak and MBTA Commuter Rail services, as well as Red Line subway trains and Silver Line bus rapid transit.

In South Boston, Summer Street goes past the Boston Convention and Exhibition Center.

Current and former residents

Notable locations
 100 Summer Street
 Boston Internet Exchange at One Summer Street
 Federal Reserve Bank of Boston
 Fidelity Investments
 South Station

Notable residents
 John Andrew & Son
 Joseph Barrell
 Edward Everett
 Filene's Department Store
 William Gray, 19th-century merchant
 John Hull 
 New South Church
 L.C. Page & Company
 Ebenezer Pemberton, c. 1810, educator
 James Sullivan, governor
 Trinity Church

Image gallery

See also
Dewey Square
Downtown Crossing
Great Boston Fire of 1872
Summer Street Bridge disaster

References

Further reading
 City of Boston, Landmarks Commission. Church Green Buildings Study Report, 1979

External links

, 1982.
, 1996.
Flickr. Photo, 2008
Flickr. Residence of Edward Everett. Corner Otis St. & Summer
Flickr. Photo, 2006
Flickr. Photo, 1989

1708 establishments in Massachusetts
History of Boston
Financial District, Boston
Seaport District
Streets in Boston